General Johnson may refer to:
 General Johnson (musician) (1941–2010), American musician

General Johnson may also refer to generals with the surname of Johnson:

United Kingdom
Allen Johnson (Indian Army officer) (1829–1907), British Indian Army general
Charles Bulkeley Bulkeley-Johnson (1867–1917), British Army brigadier general
Charles Cooper Johnson (1827–1905), British Army general
Dudley Graham Johnson (1884–1975), British Army major general
Edwin Beaumont Johnson (1825–1893), British Army general
Garry Johnson (born 1937), British Army general
George Johnson (British Army officer) (1903–1980), British Army major general
Sir Henry Johnson, 1st Baronet (1748–1835), British Army general
Sir John Johnson, 2nd Baronet (1741–1830), British Loyalist in the American Revolution and King's Royal Regiment of New York brigadier general
Sir William Johnson, 1st Baronet (c. 1715–1774), British Army major general

United States
Andrew Johnson (1808–1875), Union Army brigadier general
Arthur Johnson (Army general) (1862–1946), U.S. Army brigadier general
Bradley Tyler Johnson (1829–1903), Confederate States Army brigadier general
Bushrod Johnson (1817–1880), Confederate States Army major general
Byron F. Johnson (1894–1980), U.S. Marine Corps major general
Dean Johnson (politician) (born 1947), U.S. Army National Guard brigadier general
Edward Johnson (general) (1816–1873), Confederate States Army major general
Evan M. Johnson (1861–1923), U.S. Army brigadier general
George Johnson (general) (1918–2021), U.S. Air Force major general
Gerald W. Johnson (military officer) (1919–2002), U.S. Air Force lieutenant general
Hansford T. Johnson (born 1936), U.S. Air Force general
Harold Keith Johnson (1912–1983), U.S. Army general
Herbert Thomas Johnson (1872–1942), Vermont National Guard brigadier general
Harry H. Johnson (1895–1987), U.S. Army major general
Hugh S. Johnson (1881–1942), U.S. Army brigadier general
James Allen Johnson, U.S. Army major general
James H. Johnson (major general) (born 1929), U.S. Army major general
James H. Johnson Jr. (born 1937), U.S. Army lieutenant general
John D. Johnson (general), U.S. Army lieutenant general
John P. Johnson (general) (fl. 1980s–2010s), U.S. Army major general
Kermit D. Johnson (born 1928), U.S. Army major general
Leon W. Johnson (1904–1997), U.S. Air Force general
Michelle D. Johnson (born c. 1959), U.S. Air Force lieutenant general
Paul Johnson (United States Air Force) (born 1958), U.S. Air Force major general
Richard W. Johnson (1827–1897), Union Army brigadier general
Rodney L. Johnson (born 1955), U.S. Army brigadier general
Stephen T. Johnson (born 1950), U.S. Marine Corps major general
Stovepipe Johnson (1834–1922), Confederate States Army brigadier general
Thomas Johnson (jurist) (1732–1819), Maryland Militia brigadier general

Others
Frank W. Johnson (1799–1884), Army of the Republic of Texas general
Mobolaji Johnson (1936–2019), Nigerian Army brigadier general

See also
Hazel Johnson-Brown (1927–2011), U.S. Army brigadier general
Attorney General Johnson (disambiguation)
Johnson (disambiguation)